Heliothela nigralbata is a moth of the family Crambidae. It was described by John Henry Leech in 1889. It is found in Zhejiang, China.

References

Moths described in 1889
Heliothelini